The 2020–21 Butler Bulldogs men's basketball team represented Butler University in the 2020–21 NCAA Division I men's basketball season. They were coached by LaVall Jordan, in his fourth year as head coach of his alma mater. The Bulldogs played their home games at Hinkle Fieldhouse in Indianapolis, Indiana as members of the Big East Conference. They finished the season 10–15, 8–12 to finish in 10th place in Big East play. In the Big East tournament, they defeated Xavier in the first round before losing to Creighton in the quarterfinals.

Previous season 
The Bulldogs finished the 2019–20 season 23–9, 10–8 to finish in fifth place in Big East play. In the Big East tournament, they were scheduled to play Providence in the quarterfinals, but the tournament was canceled due to the ongoing COVID-19 pandemic, All remaining postseason tournaments were thereafter canceled, including the NCAA tournament, effectively ending the Bulldogs season.

Offseason

Departures

Incoming transfers

Recruiting classes

2020 recruiting class

2021 recruiting class

Roster

Schedule and results
 
|-
!colspan=9 style=|Regular season
|-

|-
!colspan=9 style="|Big East tournament

Rankings

*AP does not release post-NCAA tournament rankings.

Awards

References

Butler
Butler Bulldogs men's basketball seasons
Butler
Butler